Dede Yusuf Macan Effendi (born 14 September 1966 in Jakarta), better known as Dede Yusuf, is an Indonesian actor known for his action films and sinetrons. He was also a member of Dewan Perwakilan Rakyat from Partai Amanat Nasional from 2004 to 2009 and he was the Vice Governor of West Java province from 2008 to 2013.

Awards and nominations

References

External links
  Dede Yusuf di Kancah Politik Indonesia
  Profile on Tokohnasional.com
 IMDB filmography
 CITWF filmography
 

Indonesian male film actors
Indonesian Muslims
1966 births
Living people
Minangkabau people
Sundanese people
Vice Governors of West Java